Teresa Bonvalot (born 7 October 1999) is a Portuguese professional surfer. At club level she represents Sporting CP. She represented Portugal at the 2020 Summer Olympics in the women's shortboard event. In 2022 Teresa missed the WCT qualification by 1 spot.

Career 
She placed 21st on the 2016 and 2015 Women's Championship Tour rankings after she placed twice 13th at Cascais Women's Pro in Portugal. She won the European surfing junior championionships both in 2016 and 2017.

In 2017 she placed 9th at the Cascais Women's Pro where she was a wildcard. This was her best result at a WCT event and she eventually ended the season at 20th in the WCT ranking, her best ever.

Surfing results

Victories

References

1999 births
Living people
Sportspeople from Cascais
Portuguese female surfers
World Surf League surfers
Olympic surfers of Portugal
Surfers at the 2020 Summer Olympics